Queen Debsirindra of Siam, formerly Queen Ramphoei Phamaraphirom, born Princess Ramphoei Siriwong (17 July 1834 – 9 September 1862), was the second consort of King Mongkut, and mother of King Chulalongkorn.

Biography 

Princess Ramphoei was born in 1834 to Siriwong, Prince Mattayaphithak (son of Rama III and Concubine Sap) and Lady Noi (Mom Noi). She was of Mon descent. When her father died at only 27 years, her grandfather—the king—took her and her sister Phannarai to the Grand Palace and they were said to be his favourite grandchildren. In 1853, Ramphoei married her great-uncle Mongkut (who was 30 years her senior) and was raised to a Phra Ong Chao (a higher rank of princess). In the same year she gave birth to Prince Chulalongkorn. She later became Queen Ramphoei.

She had 4 children with King Mongkut.
 Prince Chulalongkorn, later King Chulalongkorn (1853–1910)
 Princess Chandrmondol / Chanthonmonthon, later the Princess Wisutkrasat (1855–1863)
 Prince Chaturonrasmi / Chaturon Ratsami, later the Prince Chakrabardibongse (1856–1900)
 Prince Bhanurangsi Savangwongse, later the Prince Bhanubandhuwongse Voradej (1859–1928)

Queen Ramphoei died in 1861. Her sister (who was also Mongkut's wife), Princess Phannarai, acted as Mongkut's consort for the remainder of his reign. When Chulalongkorn was crowned in 1867, she was posthumously given the title Debsirindramataya, the Queen Mother. Her grandson, Vajiravudh (Rama VI), gave her the name Queen Debsirindra.

Ancestors

References

External links
 Debsirin school

|-

1834 births
1861 deaths
19th-century Thai women
19th-century Chakri dynasty
Thai people of Mon descent
Queen mothers
People from Bangkok
Thai princesses consort
Thai female Phra Ong Chao
Thai female Mom Chao
Siriwong family